Hinari Access to Research for Health Programme was set up by the World Health Organization and major publishers to enable developing countries to access collections of biomedical and health literature. There are up to 15,000 e-journals and up to 60,000 online books available to health institutions in more than 10 countries. Hinari is part of Research4Life, the collective name for five programs - Hinari (focusing on health), AGORA (focusing on agriculture), OARE (focusing on environment), ARDI (focusing on applied science and technology) and GOALI (focusing on law and justice). Together, Research4Life provides lower income countries with free or low cost access to academic and professional peer-reviewed content online.

The Hinari programme, and the other programmes, were reviewed for the second time in 2010 and the publishers involved have committed to continuing with it until at least 2025. Hinari has received the high honor of the Medical Library Association's 2015 Louise Darling Medal for Collection Development in the Health Sciences.

History
In response to a call by the then UN Secretary General Kofi Annan and to a statement issued by Gro Harlem Brundtland the then Director General World Health Organization, Hinari was launched in July 2001 with a statement of intent from six major publishers: Blackwell Publishing, Elsevier, the Harcourt, Wolters Kluwer, Springer Science+Business Media, and John Wiley & Sons.  The Hinari name began as an acronym of Health Inter-Network Access to Research Initiative. The use of the full name was later abandoned.  The program opened for use in January 2002 with around 1,500 journals from the initial six publishers. , there are almost 200 publisher partners providing their online publications through Hinari. 3,750 journal titles were accessible via Hinari in 2007. Critiques of Hinari argue that the low-cost model is still too high for many institutions and journals with top impact factors are not included in some countries.

Access
Institutions eligible to access the information are: national universities, professional schools (medicine, nursing, pharmacy, public health, dentistry), research institutes, teaching hospitals and healthcare centers, government offices, national medical libraries and local non-governmental organizations.

Criteria for countries
The country lists are based on four factors: Total GNI (World Bank figures), GNI per capita (World Bank figures), United Nations Least Developed Country (LDCs) List and Human Development Index (HDI). In 2007 users and members of eligible institutions in 113 countries had access. In 2019, the number of eligible countries, areas and territories stood at more than 120. Some large, emerging countries including India and China are excluded by the program because their total GNI exceeds US$1 trillion.

Related initiatives
TEEAL (The Essential Electronic Agricultural Library)
AGORA (Access to Global Online Research in Agriculture)
OARE (Online Access to Research in the Environment)
ARDI (Access to Research for Development and Innovation)
GOALI (Global Online Access to Legal Information)

References

External links 
 
Research4Life Partnership
institution/country list 2019, as classified by Research4Life

World Health Organization
Academic publishing
International medical and health organizations